Lullington is a village and former civil parish, now in the parish of Cuckmere Valley, in the Wealden district, in the county of East Sussex, England. Historically in Sussex, it lies 9⅓ miles southeast of Lewes, on a shoulder of the South Downs at the point where the River Cuckmere cuts through the downs. It faces Alfriston on the opposite bank of the river.  In 1961 the parish had a population of 35. On 1 April 1990 the parish was abolished and merged with Litlington and Westdean to form Cuckmere Valley.

Lullington Church is claimed to be the smallest church in England.

References

External links
 Kelly's Directory of Kent, Surrey & Sussex, 1891

External links

Villages in East Sussex
Former civil parishes in East Sussex
Wealden District